The Columbus mayoral election of 1919 was the 61st mayoral election in Columbus, Ohio.  It was held on Tuesday, November 4, 1919.  Incumbent Democratic mayor George J. Karb was defeated by Republican party nominee James J. Thomas.

References

Bibliography

1919 Ohio elections
Mayoral elections in Columbus, Ohio
Columbus